Jeff Basil Carr is a Canadian politician, who was elected to the Legislative Assembly of New Brunswick in the 2014 provincial election. He represents the electoral district of New Maryland-Sunbury as a member of the Progressive Conservatives.

Background

He is the older brother of Jack Carr, his predecessor as MLA for New Maryland-Sunbury, and Jody Carr, the MLA for the neighbouring district of Oromocto-Lincoln.

Prior to his election to the legislature, he worked as an executive assistant in his brother Jody's office when he was the Minister of Education and later as Minister of Post-Secondary Education, Training and Labour.

Following his re-election in 2018, Carr was appointed as Minister of Environment and Local Government where he remains the Minister of that portfolio. Carr was re-elected in the 2020 provincial election.

References

Living people
Members of the Executive Council of New Brunswick
Progressive Conservative Party of New Brunswick MLAs
21st-century Canadian politicians
Year of birth missing (living people)